The uncertainty budget is an aid for specifying the expanded measurement uncertainty. The individual measurement uncertainty factors are summarised, usually in tabular form, in the measurement uncertainty budget.

Following the description of the measurement procedure and the laying down of the complete model equation, the knowledge of all input variables (values, distribution function, standard uncertainties) can be illustrated in the uncertainty budget.
From this it is then possible to determine the result value and its standard uncertainty–, the expansion factor and the specification of the expanded measurement uncertainty.
For series of measurements (continually sampled measurement sequences), distinction must be made between two cases: constant measurement uncertainty budget and changeable measurement uncertainty budget.

Constant measurement uncertainty budget 
The measurement uncertainty is neither directly nor indirectly dependent on time. The measurement uncertainty budget is determined once and remains constant. With a constant measurement uncertainty budget, complete data records can now be acquired. The measurement uncertainty applies to every single measurement point. If the measurement uncertainty is constant, this simplifies the further processing based on the data records.
Example
Determination of the temperature of the oil in an oil sump. A thermocouple and a measuring device are used for this. The measurement uncertainty of the measuring amplifier and the thermocouple used does not change. Both are read from the respective data sheet and are thus to be regarded as a constant.

Changeable measurement uncertainty budget (external circumstances vary) 
A different measured value arises for the measurement uncertainty with each new measurement. The measurement uncertainty budget must be re-determined for each measured value.
Examples

1. A measured temperature value is read every day. Decisive influencing variables are ambient temperature and air pressure, which can vary every day.

2. The measurement uncertainty strongly depends on the size of the measured value itself, e.g. amplitude-proportional.

See also 
 measurement uncertainty
 uncertainty
 accuracy and precision
 confidence Interval

Measurement